The Dakshin Gangotri Glacier is a small tongue of the polar continental ice sheet impinging on the Schirmacher Oasis of central Queen Maud Land, Antarctica.  It was discovered by the Second Indian Expedition to Antarctica in 1983, and is named after the Gangotri Glacier in the Himalayas. The first Antarctic research base of India, Dakshin Gangotri is located near to the glacier. Since then its snout, and the area around it, has been regularly monitored and it has become a valuable site for tracking the impact of global warming through changes in the movement of the Antarctic ice sheet.  The site is protected under the Antarctic Treaty System as Antarctic Specially Protected Area (ASPA) No.163.

See also
 List of glaciers in the Antarctic
 Glaciology

References

Antarctic Specially Protected Areas
Glaciers of Queen Maud Land